The LG U830 is a third generation fliptop mobile phone with HSPDA support. The U830 includes a 2-megapixel camera with flash and an internal camera for video calls.

References

U830
Mobile phones introduced in 2006